New Andalusia Province or Province of Cumaná (1537–1864) was a province of the Spanish Empire, and later of Gran Colombia and Venezuela. It included the territory of present-day Venezuelan states Sucre, Anzoátegui and Monagas. Its most important cities were the Capital City Cumaná and New Barcelona.

Spanish Empire

Its provincial capital, Cumaná, was refounded in 1569 by explorer Diego Hernández de Serpa. The Province originally comprised what is now eastern Venezuela, western Guyana, and far northern Brazil. In the following centuries, its jurisdiction was reduced to Cumaná and Barcelona and was synonymous with Cumaná Province.

Early in its history, the conquistador Joan Orpí founded a new Province, of Nueva Cataluña (New Catalonia), also known as New Barcelona after its capital, Barcelona, partly from territory belonging to New Andalusia. This lasted from 1637 to 1654, when it was incorporated into New Andalusia. Guayana Province (created 1585) provided a southern boundary, while Venezuela Province provided a western one.

For most of its existence, the Royal Audience of Santo Domingo oversaw its administrative and judicial matters. In the late 18th century, it was incorporated into the newly created Captaincy General of Venezuela.

Gran Colombia

Following the Venezuelan Declaration of Independence (1811), the Province became one of the Provinces of Gran Colombia (after 1824, within the Orinoco Department).

Capital: Cumaná.

Cantones: 
 Cumaná, 
 Carupano, 
 Cumanacoa, 
 Maturín, 
 Cariaco, 
 Aragua Cumanés 
 Río Caribes.

Following Venezuelan independence in 1830, it became a Province of Venezuela, until the creation of the States of Venezuela in 1864. Between 1810 and 1840 it lost the Canton Piacoa (covering the Orinoco River delta) to Guayana Province; this later became the state of Delta Amacuro.

External links
"Venezuela Together with the Southern Part of New Andalusia" a map from 1630

Provinces of the Spanish Empire
Colonial Colombia
Colonial Venezuela
Former colonies in South America
History of Colombia
History of Guyana
History of Venezuela
Provinces of Gran Colombia
Provinces of Venezuela
Spanish colonization of the Americas
16th century in Venezuela
17th century in Venezuela
18th century in Venezuela
16th century in South America
17th century in South America
18th century in South America
States and territories established in 1537
16th-century establishments in Venezuela
States and territories disestablished in 1864
1537 establishments in the Spanish Empire
1537 establishments in South America
1864 disestablishments in the Spanish Empire
1864 disestablishments in South America
Cumaná